Muhlenbergia reverchonii is a species of grass known by the common name seep muhly. It is native to Oklahoma and Texas in the United States.

This perennial bunchgrass produces erect stems up to 80 centimeters (31.5 inches) tall. The hairlike leaves are up to 35 centimeters long. The inflorescence is a panicle of brown to purplish spikelets. Aged stands of the grass "form a curly, fibrous mass''.

In the wild this grass grows on rocky calcareous substrates, such as limestone outcrops.

This grass is used for ornamental purposes. The cultivar 'Autumn Embers' has a panicle with a more pink coloration.

References

External links
USDA Plants Profile for Muhlenbergia reverchonii 

reverchonii
Native grasses of Oklahoma
Native grasses of Texas
Native grasses of the Great Plains region
Endemic flora of the United States
Least concern flora of the United States